The Heroj class was a class of diesel-electric attack submarines built for the Yugoslav Navy during the 1960s. The three strong class was the second generation of domestically built submarines, representing a significant improvement compared to the earlier . Built at the Brodogradilište specijalnih objekata (eng. Special objects shipyard) in Split, the new class featured a streamlined hull design and four bow facing torpedo tubes that could also be used for minelaying.

With the start of the Croatian War of Independence all three boats were relocated from the Lora Naval Base to Montenegro where they were commissioned with the SR Yugoslav Navy. The last two boats of the class, Junak and Uskok, were decommissioned during the 1990s and scrapped. Heroj was decommissioned in 2004 and after restoration laid up at the Porto Montenegro Museum in 2013.

Description 
Surfaced they displaced  and  while underwater. The diesel-electric drive consisted of two Mercedes diesel generators and single Končar electric motor mounted on a single shaft. This enabled them a maximum speed of  underwater and  when surfaced. The boats were manned by a complement of 28 crew members.

Armament of the class consisted of four  torpedo tubes used for launching up to six SET-65E active/passive homing torpedoes or deploying up to twelve naval mines instead. The boat's sensor suite included a "Stop Light" radar warning receiver, a "Snoop Group" surface search radar and a Thomson Sintra Eledone hull mounted sonar.

Boats

Service and aftermath 

Heroj was launched on 21 August 1967 sponsored by the commander of the Yugoslav Navy, Admiral Mate Jerković. Before being officially commissioned with the Navy, Heroj underwent a series of sea trials in order to test the maximum operational parameters of the submarine. When the submarine reached , the boat's fiberglass sail collapsed. This in turn affected the hydrodynamics by creating a positive trim and surfacing the submarine at high speed within seconds.

After overcoming these difficulties, the boat was clear for service and was officially commissioned on 10 September 1968. Two other units soon followed with Junak being commissioned in 1969 and Uskok in 1970.

Notes

References 
Books

Other sources

Ships of the Yugoslav Navy
Submarine classes